Acanthoniscus is a monotypic genus of woodlice belonging to the family Delatorreiidae. The only species is Acanthoniscus spiniger.

The species is found in Caribbean.

References

Woodlice